A penumbral lunar eclipse will take place on July 16, 2038.

Visibility

Related lunar eclipses

Lunar year series

See also 
List of lunar eclipses and List of 21st-century lunar eclipses

Notes

External links 
 

2038-07
2038-07
2038 in science